Thomas Smyth (1 December 1884 – 19 May 1928) was an Irish international, rugby union prop forward who played club rugby for Newport and Malone and invitational rugby with the Barbarians. He won fourteen caps for Ireland and was selected to captain the British Isles 1910 tour of South Africa, and played in two of the test games.

Rugby career
Smyth first played for Ireland in 1908, in the Home Nations Championship against England at Richmond's Athletic Ground. Although Ireland lost the match 13-3 Smyth was back for the next game of the tournament against Scotland. With the match played at Lansdowne Road, the Irish beat the Scottish team in a game which was notable as the last game for Scotland's David Bedell-Sivright, the British Isle's captain of the 1904 campaign to Australia and New Zealand. Smyth played out the 1909 and 1910 Championships and scored his first international try in the 1910 game against France. Smyth's next and last score for his country was in a 3–0 win at Lansdowne road versus England, when the Harlequin centre Frank Stoop's poor clearing kick led to Smyth scoring the only points of the game when he took the ball over the line for a try.

International matches played

Ireland
  1908, 1909, 1910, 1911, 1912
  1910
  1908, 1909, 1910, 1911
  1908, 1909, 1910, 1911

British Isles
  1910, 1910

References

Rugby union props
Rugby union players from Belfast
Irish rugby union players
Ireland international rugby union players
1884 births
1928 deaths
Newport RFC players
British & Irish Lions rugby union players from Ireland
Barbarian F.C. players
Malone RFC players